New Way is an unincorporated community in Licking County, in the U.S. state of Ohio.

History
A post office was established at New Way in 1851, and remained in operation until 1902. The community took its name from the New Way Universalist church.

References

Unincorporated communities in Licking County, Ohio
1851 establishments in Ohio
Populated places established in 1851
Unincorporated communities in Ohio